Anthony Roberson (born February 14, 1983) is an American professional basketball player who is currently a free agent. Roberson played college basketball for the University of Florida, and signed with the NBA's Memphis Grizzlies as an undrafted free agent in 2005.

Early years
Roberson was born in Saginaw, Michigan.  He attended Saginaw High School, where he played high school basketball for the Saginaw Trojans and was recognized as a Parade magazine high school All-American as a senior.  Roberson was recruited by the University of Florida, Duke University, Michigan State University and the University of Michigan, after averaging 24 points per game as a high school junior.  He ultimately chose to attend Florida.

College career
Roberson accepted an athletic scholarship to attend the University of Florida in Gainesville, Florida, where he played for coach Billy Donovan's Florida Gators men's basketball team from 2003 to 2005.  He chose to forgo his final year of NCAA eligibility and left school after his third college season to enter the NBA Draft.

Professional career
He declared for the 2005 NBA draft after his junior season, and signed with the Memphis Grizzlies in August 2005, after going undrafted. Throughout the 2005–06 NBA season, he split his time between the Grizzlies and the Arkansas RimRockers, the Grizzlies' D-League affiliate.

In October 2006 he was signed by the Golden State Warriors to be evaluated during training camp, and would appear in 20 contests in 2006–07, being waived in early January 2007.

On December 4, 2006, Roberson scored his NBA career high 21 points against the San Antonio Spurs.

After failing to find a job in the NBA in 2007–08, Roberson went overseas and spent the season in Israel (playing for Hapoel Jerusalem) and Turkey.

In July 2008, Roberson was invited to be part of the New York Knicks' summer league team and, on July 16, agreed in principle to a 2-year deal with the team.

On February 19, 2009, Roberson was traded to the Chicago Bulls along with center Jerome James and forward Tim Thomas in exchange for guard Larry Hughes. On July 20, Roberson was waived by the Bulls.

Roberson later played in France with Strasbourg IG. On September 24, 2010, he signed with the Los Angeles Lakers, but he was waived before the start of the season.

On October 8, 2014, Roberson signed a one-year contract with Cypriot side APOEL. He won his first trophy with APOEL just after his first official game, helping his team to win the 2014 Cypriot Super Cup by beating Apollon Limassol 74–58, in a match which Roberson was the top scorer with 19 points.

On July 18, 2016, Boulazac signed with the French team Boulazac Basket Dordogne.

Personal life
His cousin, Terrance Roberson, played college basketball at Fresno State and appeared in three games for the Charlotte Hornets in 2000.

NBA career statistics

Regular season

|-
| align="left" | 
| align="left" | Memphis
| 16 || 0 || 5.5 || .452 || .500 || 1.000 || .4 || .3 || .1 || .0 || 2.2
|-
| align="left" | 
| align="left" | Golden State
| 20 || 1 || 11.4 || .423 || .382 || .667 || 1.1 || .5 || .6 || .0 || 5.6
|-
| align="left" | 
| align="left" | New York
| 23 || 0 || 11.0 || .379 || .338 || 1.000 || .7 || .8 || .4 || .0 || 4.7
|-
| align="left" | 
| align="left" | Chicago
| 6 || 0 || 3.8 || .294 || .200 || .000 || 1.2 || .2 || .0 || .0 || 2.0
|- class="sortbottom"
| style="text-align:center;" colspan="2"| Career
| 65 || 1 || 9.1 || .400 || .356 || .900 || .8 || .5 || .4 || .0 || 4.1

Playoffs

|-
| align="left" | 2009
| align="left" | Chicago
| 1 || 0 || 4.0 || .750 || 1.000 || .000 || 1.0 || .0 || 2.0 || .0 || 8.0
|- class="sortbottom"
| style="text-align:center;" colspan="2"| Career
| 1 || 0 || 4.0 || .750 || 1.000 || .000 || 1.0 || .0 || 2.0 || .0 || 8.0

See also
List of Florida Gators in the NBA

References

External links
NBA.com profile

1983 births
Living people
African-American basketball players
American expatriate basketball people in Argentina
American expatriate basketball people in China
American expatriate basketball people in Cyprus
American expatriate basketball people in France
American expatriate basketball people in Greece
American expatriate basketball people in Israel
American expatriate basketball people in Italy
American expatriate basketball people in Mexico
American expatriate basketball people in Qatar
American expatriate basketball people in Turkey
American men's basketball players
APOEL B.C. players
Arkansas RimRockers players
Basketball players from Michigan
Chicago Bulls players
Florida Gators men's basketball players
Fujian Sturgeons players
Golden State Warriors players
Hapoel Jerusalem B.C. players
Ikaros B.C. players
Israeli Basketball Premier League players
La Unión basketball players
Libertadores de Querétaro players
McDonald's High School All-Americans
Memphis Grizzlies players
Metropolitans 92 players
New Basket Brindisi players
New York Knicks players
Parade High School All-Americans (boys' basketball)
Point guards
SIG Basket players
Sportspeople from Saginaw, Michigan
Türk Telekom B.K. players
Undrafted National Basketball Association players
21st-century African-American sportspeople
20th-century African-American people